Adusius (Old Persian , Ancient Greek ) was, according to the account of Xenophon in his Cyropaedeia, sent by Cyrus the Great with an army into Caria, to put an end to the feuds which existed in the country.  He afterwards assisted Hystaspes in subduing Phrygia, and was made satrap of Caria, as the inhabitants had requested.

References

Achaemenid satraps of Caria
6th-century BC rulers
5th-century BC Iranian people